Yersey is a submarine volcano in Indonesia. It was listed as an active volcano in the old sea charts at the location in the southern of Banda Basin. During the 1929 survey, the volcano was spotted at the depth of 3,800 m along the ridge that stretches from Batu Tara until Gunungapi Wetar.

See also 

 List of volcanoes in Indonesia

References 

Volcanoes of the Lesser Sunda Islands
Submarine volcanoes of Indonesia
Seamounts of the Banda Sea